Gornovodyanoye is a rural locality (a selo) and the administrative center of Gornovodyanovskoye Rural Settlement, Dubovsky District, Volgograd Oblast, Russia. The population was 723 as of 2010. There are 14 streets.

Geography 
Gornovodyanoye is located in steppe, on the west bank of the Volgograd Reservoir, 28 km northeast of Dubovka (the district's administrative centre) by road. Strelnoshirokoye is the nearest rural locality.

References 

Rural localities in Dubovsky District, Volgograd Oblast